Lajos Hegyeshalmi or Hegyeshalmy (21 October 1862 – 7 March 1925) was a Hungarian politician, who served as acting Minister of Finance in 1921. After his graduating he was appointed head secretary of the Hungarian National Bank, later he worked for the National Statistical Office. Between 1910 and 1914 he was the deputy chairman of the Hungarian State Railways. He served as Minister of Trade twice: in 1919 and between 1920 and 1922. Hegyeshalmi was member of the Diet of Hungary.

References
 Magyar Életrajzi Lexikon

1862 births
1925 deaths
People from Pest, Hungary
Finance ministers of Hungary